The 2020 season was Penang's 93rd competitive season, 2nd consecutive season in the second tier of Malaysian football  since relegated in 2017, and 98th year in existence as a football club.

Events
On 25 December 2018, Ndumba Makeche joined the club.

On 23 January 2019, the club announced New Jersey kit for the 2020 Malaysia Premier League season.

On 10 May 2019, Ezequiel Agüero signed a contract with the club.

On 14 July 2019, the club won 6–3 over Sarawak in Malaysia Premier League match.

Started matchday 7, on 30 April 2019, Kang Seung-jo has been appointed as club captain, previously held by Abdul Qayyum Jabrullah.

Coaching staff

 Head coach: Manzoor Azwira
 Assistant head coach: Kamal Kalid
 Assistant coach: Mat Saiful Mohamad
 Goalkeeper coach: Khairul Nizam Mohd Taib
 Fitness coach: Mohd Rozy Abdul Majid

Players

As of the 2019 season.

First-team squad

Competitions

Malaysia Premier League

Malaysia FA Cup

Malaysia Cup

Group stage

Statistics

Appearances and goals

|-
! colspan="16" style="background:#dcdcdc; text-align:center"| Goalkeepers

|-
! colspan="16" style="background:#dcdcdc; text-align:center"| Defenders

|-
! colspan="16" style="background:#dcdcdc; text-align:center"| Midfielders

|-
! colspan="16" style="background:#dcdcdc; text-align:center"| Forwards

|-
! colspan="16" style="background:#dcdcdc; text-align:center"| Players transferred out during the season

|-

References

2019
Penang F.C.
Penang